Edward Alan John George, Baron George  (16 September 1938 – 18 April 2009), known as Eddie George, or sometimes as "Steady Eddie", was Governor of the Bank of England from 1993 to 2003 and sat on the board of NM Rothschild and Sons.

Early life
George was born and grew up in Carshalton, the son of Alan, a Post Office clerk, and his wife Olive. He attended the independent school Dulwich College on a scholarship. Having learned to speak Russian at Dulwich, he carried out his National Service at the Joint Services School for Linguists. He attended and graduated from Emmanuel College, Cambridge.

Financial career
George joined the Bank of England in 1962. Apart from secondments to Moscow State University, the Bank for International Settlements and the International Monetary Fund, he remained there throughout his career.

After three years as Deputy Governor, he was appointed Governor of the Bank of England to succeed Robin Leigh-Pemberton, who retired on the completion of his second five-year term of office on 30 June 1993. During the early part of George's governance, his successful relationship with then-Chancellor of the Exchequer Kenneth Clarke gained for them the nickname of 'the Ken and Eddie Show'. Upon the Labour Party coming to power at the 1997 general election, the Bank was given independence in setting UK interest rates by Gordon Brown, the incoming Chancellor of the Exchequer. George was succeeded as Governor of the Bank of England in July 2003 by Mervyn King.

George attracted controversy in 1998 when he was widely reported to have made a statement to London newspaper executives implying that unemployment in the north of England was a price worth paying to preserve affluence in the south of the country. He later claimed that his remarks had been misconstrued.

Later life
George served as a Governor of his former school, Dulwich College, between 1998 and 2008, and served as the Chairman of the Governors between 2003 and 2008.

On 18 April 2009, George, a heavy smoker, died of lung cancer.

Personal life
George married Vanessa George, Lady George (née Williams) in Surrey in 1962. They had three children. Lady George died in March 2017.

Honours
George was appointed Knight Grand Cross of the Order of the British Empire in the 2000 Birthday Honours. He was made a life peer in June 2004 as Baron George, of St Tudy in the County of Cornwall. He was awarded an honorary D.Sc. by the University of Buckingham on 4 March 2000, and appointed a Deputy Lieutenant of Cornwall in March 2006.

Arms

References

1938 births
2009 deaths
Alumni of Emmanuel College, Cambridge
British economists
Crossbench life peers
Deaths from lung cancer in England
Deputy Lieutenants of Cornwall
English bankers
Knights Grand Cross of the Order of the British Empire
Members of the Privy Council of the United Kingdom
George, Edward George, Baron
Nestlé people
People educated at Dulwich College
Governors of the Bank of England
People from Carshalton
Deputy Governors of the Bank of England
N M Rothschild & Sons people
20th-century English businesspeople
Life peers created by Elizabeth II